The Swedish Mission Society (Swedish:  (SMS), later ), was a Swedish Christian organization to promote mission work among the Sámi in Sweden.

History 
The Swedish Mission Society was founded in 1835 by George Scott, Samuel Owen, Johan Olof Wallin, Mathias Rosenblad, and Carl Fredrik af Wingård, with the aim of promoting mission work among the Sámi in Lappmarken through direct missionary work and by promoting public interest. The task included organizing missionary church services, publishing missionary tracts, supporting young men who wanted to be trained as missionaries and catechists in Lappmarken.

In 1839, SMS established three mission schools for Sámi children in Knaften, Mårdsele and Bastuträsk. A few years later, a school for Sámi girls was started in Tannsele. Further mission schools were established in the 1850s, including in Gafsele, Bäsksele and Glommersträsk. About fifty catechists and teachers, male and female, were sent out. The Swedish Mission Society also supported several foreign missionary societies and sent Theodore Hamberg as a missionary to China in 1846. Sámi activist Torkel Tomasson attended a Swedish Mission Society school for a time.

The preacher  and the Friends of the Lapland Mission had also taken the initiative to build , which was consecrated in 1934. The Swedish Mission Society was responsible for running the church until 1954.

It was dissolved in 2001. It has to some extent lived on in the Foundation Missionssällskapet Kyrkan och Samerna, based in Luleå and linked to the dioceses of Luleå and Härnösand.

References

Further reading

External links 

  (Archive partially digitized)

Sámi history
Church of Sweden
Religious organizations established in 1835
Defunct organizations based in Sweden
Lutheran missions